
 
 

Eba Anchorage is a locality in the Australian state of South Australia located in the state's west on the eastern shore of Streaky Bay on the west coast of the Eyre Peninsula about  north-west of the state capital of Adelaide and about  north-east of the municipal seat of Streaky Bay.

Boundaries for the locality were created on 12 April 2001 and include the former Eba Island Shack Site.  Its name is of local origin.

Eba Anchorage is located between the coastline of Streaky Bay in the west and the alignment of the Flinders Highway in the east.

The 2016 Australian census which was conducted in August 2016 reports that Eba Anchorage had a population of 33 people.

Eba Anchorage is located within the federal division of Grey, the state electoral district of Flinders and the local government area of the District Council of Streaky Bay.

References
Notes

Citations

 

Towns in South Australia
Eyre Peninsula